Patrik Karl Gunnar Carlsson (born November 3, 1987) is a Swedish professional ice hockey right winger, currently playing for Frölunda HC of the Swedish Hockey League (SHL). He has played for seven different teams over the course of a 15 year career (as of 2019).

Career statistics

Awards and honors

References

External links
 

1987 births
Living people
Frölunda HC players
HIFK (ice hockey) players
HV71 players
Leksands IF players
Södertälje SK players
Swedish ice hockey right wingers
Växjö Lakers players
People from Kungälv Municipality
Sportspeople from Västra Götaland County